Ikhkhet is a sum (district) of Dornogovi Province in south-eastern Mongolia. Zülegt fluorspar mine is located in the northern part of the sum. In 2009, its population was 2,176.

Sharavyn Gungaadorj,  the Prime Minister of Mongolia from March 21 to September 11, 1990, was born in Ikhkhet in 1935.

References 

Districts of Dornogovi Province